Bicol International Airport (Filipino: Paliparang Pandaigdig ng Bikol; Bikol: Pankinàban na Palayogan kan Bikol), also referred by some sources as Southern Luzon International Airport (Filipino: Paliparang Pandaigdig ng Katimugang Luzon), is an airport serving the vicinity of Legazpi, the capital city of Albay and the regional center of Bicol Region, in the Philippines.

Dubbed as the Philippines' "Most Scenic Gateway", the airport is located in Daraga, an adjacent municipality of Legazpi. The  project is on a  plateau  from Mayon Volcano. It replaced the old Legazpi Airport, which is only  from the BIA.

First planned in 1996 with initial construction beginning in 2008, the construction was repeatedly delayed until the airport was inaugurated on October 7, 2021. It is expected to handle an estimated 2.2 million passengers every year. While the airport is billed as an international airport, it is classified as Class 1 principal domestic airport by the Civil Aviation Authority of the Philippines.

History

Planning
Plans for an international airport in Legazpi started in 1996. In 1997, a study commissioned by the Japan International Cooperation Agency (JICA) indicated the need for expansion at four airports in the Philippines: namely Legazpi Airport, Bacolod City Domestic Airport, Mandurriao Airport in Iloilo City and Daniel Z. Romualdez Airport in Tacloban.

On March 4 and 5, 2006, officials in Daraga, where the airport would be constructed, discussed with the barangay captains and Leaders of barangays Alobo, Inarado, Kinawitan, Burgos, Martos territory, Velasco Hacienda, and Mabini over the conversion of agricultural lands into industrial lands for the airport. It is estimated to occupy at least  of land, and many families could be displaced from the construction. It will be the first international airport to be built in Bicolandia and, according to Daraga Mayor Gerry Rodrigueza Jaucian, would be a testament to economic growth in the region and of the dreams of Bicolanos, as shown in the following excerpt from the Manila Times: "We’re grateful to the President for fulfilling the Bicolanos’ dream to have an international airport. This is the realization of our quest to become one of the booming regions in the country."

Construction and delays
In July 2007, ordered the Department of Transportation and Communications (DoTC; now simply Department of Transportation), to fast-track the paperwork on the planned new airport. Then-President Gloria Macapagal Arroyo released  for its advance engineering study.

The airport was originally scheduled for completion in 2014. However, due to a construction delay, the project was expected to be finished at an unspecified date before 2016. In June 2015, it was reported that the construction is 47% done and would be finished in July 2017, but in July 2016 it was reported that the construction would be delayed further and would be finished in August 2018.

In September 2012, the Department of Budget and Management released  to support the public-private partnership (PPP) projects of the DOTC. Of the total, the airport will receive  to develop and fund the engineering of runways and taxiways.

Construction works for the runway, taxiway, apron, and fences were mostly left uncompleted in 2012, and budget was reverted to the national treasury.

The construction was fast-tracked under the Duterte administration through the Build! Build! Build! infrastructure program. The groundbreaking ceremony of the airport was held on December 8, 2016, with the construction of landside facilities that began in the same year.

On the night of September 28, 2017, people suspected to be members of the New People's Army committed arson to 11 heavy equipment that were used for the airport's construction.

After a delay in construction for more than a decade, Bicol International Airport was confirmed to be 50% complete in August 2018, with construction works in the runway, taxi apron, and perimeter fence being completed. By January 2020, the airport was confirmed to be 62% complete, with the airport slated for completion by July 2020. However, the July 2020 completion was delayed.

Opening and start of operations

The airport was inaugurated by President Rodrigo Duterte on October 7, 2021, with operations commencing the following day. The airport will initially handle domestic operations, while international flights were expected to start by November 7. However, there are currently no international flights servicing the airport as of December 2022.

The first commercial flight to land at the airport, Philippine Airlines Flight 2923 from Manila, a flight operated by PAL Express and performed by a Dash 8 Q400, landed at 9:57 am PHT. Cebu Pacific also started operating flights at the airport on the same day. Flights operating at the airport were initially served by turboprops until Airbus A320 flights begun on May 1, 2022. Cebu Pacific landed its first A320 flight at the airport as Flight 321 at 4:39 am PHT, while PAL landed its first A320 flight as Flight 2919 later that day.

Structure

Passenger terminal

The  passenger terminal has two levels and is designed to accommodate two million passengers annually. It features self-service check-in kiosks aside from 19 check-in counters, a lounge at the airport lobby, and two jet bridges.

EM Cuerpo handled the construction of the passenger terminal building along with the runway extension.

Runway
The runway is longer and wider than the now-defunct Legazpi Airport, allowing larger aircraft to land at the airport. Moreover, the airport is capable of operating at night.

Airlines and destinations

Statistics
Data from the Civil Aviation Authority of the Philippines (CAAP).

Incidents and accidents
 On January 10, 2018, a Gulfstream G200 jet carrying six employees of the Bangko Sentral ng Pilipinas overshot the airport's runway while attempting to make an emergency landing. All six passengers were safe. The jet was scheduled to land at the older Legazpi Airport, but strong wind that struck the aircraft forced the pilot to land at the unfinished airport.
 On February 18, 2023, a Cessna 340 plane departing from the airport en route to Manila crashed near the crater of Mayon Volcano. All four occupants were killed.

See also
Legazpi Airport
List of airports in the Philippines

Notes

References

External links
Bicol airport website

Airports in the Philippines
Airports established in 2021
2021 establishments in the Philippines
Buildings and structures in Albay
Transportation in Albay